

Historical time periods 
 Roots of hip hop
 Old school hip hop
 New school hip hop
 Golden age hip hop

Subgenres 

 Alternative hip hop
 Experimental hip hop
 Hipster hop
 Boom bap
 Bounce
 British hip hop
 Road rap
 Chopped and screwed
 Chopper
 Cloud rap
 Comedy hip hop
 Crunk
 Crunkcore
 East Coast hip hop
 Freestyle rap
 Funk carioca
 Funk ostentação
 G-funk
 Hardcore hip hop
 Dirty rap
 Gangsta rap
 Mafioso rap
 Horrorcore
 Memphis rap
 Hyphy
 Jerkin'
 Instrumental hip hop
 Latin hip hop
 Chicano rap
 Lofi hip hop
 Miami bass
 Mumble rap
 Nerdcore
 Chap hop
 Political hip hop
 Conscious hip hop
 Progressive rap
 Religious hip hop
 Christian hip hop
 Jewish hip hop
 Snap music
 Southern hip hop
 Trap music
 Drill music
 Brooklyn drill
 UK drill 
 Latin trap
 Phonk
 Plugg
 Tread
 Turntablism
 Underground hip hop
 West Coast hip hop

Fusion genres 

 Country rap
 Electro
 Emo rap
 Hip hop soul
 Hip house
 Industrial hip hop
 Jazz rap
 New jack swing
 Pop rap
 Punk rap
 Ragga hip hop
 Rap opera
 Rap rock 
 Rap metal
 Trap metal
 Rapcore
 Trip hop

Derived genres  

Electronic
 Breakbeat
 Baltimore club
 Florida breaks
 Ghetto house
 Ghettotech
 Glitch hop
 Grime
 Illbient
 Latin freestyle
 Wonky
Rock
 Nu metal
World
 Funk carioca
 Reggaeton
 Alternative reggaeton

United States regional scenes 
American hip hop regional scenes and hip hop related genres that came from them.

Eastern 
 East Coast hip hop
 New Jersey hip hop
 New York City
 Boom bap - from New York City
 Hardcore hip hop - from New York City
 Mafioso rap - from New York City
 Philadelphia hip hop
 Gangsta rap - from Philadelphia
 Tread rap - from Philadelphia
 Washington, D.C.
 Baltimore club - from Baltimore, Maryland

Midwest 
 Ghetto house - from Chicago, Illinois
 Chopper - from Kansas City, Cleveland, Chicago
 Drill - from the South Side of Chicago
 Detroit hip hop
 Ghettotech
 Minneapolis hip hop
 Omaha
 Horrorcore

Southern 
 Southern hip hop (Dirty south)
 Atlanta hip hop
 Snap
 Trap
 Houston hip hop
 Chopped and screwed
 Louisiana
 Bounce - from New Orleans, Louisiana
 Jigga music - from Baton Rouge, Louisiana
 Tennessee
 Crunk - from Memphis, Tennessee
 Memphis rap - from Memphis, Tennessee
 Slab music
 Miami bass - from Miami, Florida

Western 
 West Coast hip hop
 California
 Chicano rap - from East Los Angeles 
 Electro hop - from Los Angeles
 G-funk - from Pomona, California
 Mobb music and hyphy - from the San Francisco Bay Area
 Jerkin' - from Los Angeles
 Ratchet - from Los Angeles
 West Coast trap - from Long Beach, California
 Northwest hip hop - from Oregon or Washington

Hawaii 
 Na mele paleoleo - from Hilo, Hawaii

By descent 
 Asian American hip hop
 Latino hip hop
 Native American hip hop

World scenes

Africa 
 African hip hop
 Algerian hip hop
 Angolan hip hop
 Beninese hip hop
 Botswana hip hop
 Egyptian hip hop
 Gambian hip hop
 Gh hiphop (Ghanaian hip hop)
 Ivorian hip hop
 Kenyan hip hop
 Mauritian hip hop
 Moroccan hip hop
 Namibian hip hop
 Nigerian hip hop
 Port Harcourt hip hop
 Nigerien hip hop
 Senegalese hip hop
 South African hip hop
 Tanzanian hip hop
 Togolese hip hop
 Zambian hip hop
 Zimbabwean hip hop

Asia 
 Asian hip hop
 Azerbaijani hip hop
 Bangladeshi hip hop
 Burmese hip hop
 Chinese hip hop
 Hong Kong hip hop
 Indian hip hop
 Desi hip hop
 Indonesian hip hop
 Japanese hip hop
 Korean hip hop
 Malaysian hip hop
 Nepalese hip hop
 Pakistani hip hop
 Pinoy hip hop (Philippine hip hop)
 Singapore hip hop
 Sri Lankan hip hop
 Taiwanese hip hop
 Thai hip hop
 Cambodian hip hop

Europe 
 European hip hop
 Albanian hip hop
 Austrian hip hop
 Belgian hip hop
 Bosnian and Herzegovinian hip hop
 British hip hop
 Celtic hip hop
 Leeds hip hop
 Scottish hip hop
 Bulgarian hip hop
 Croatian hip hop
 Czech hip hop
 Dutch hip hop
 Finnish hip hop
 French hip hop
 German hip hop
 Greek hip hop
 Hip hop tuga (Portuguese hip hop)
 Hungarian hip hop
 Icelandic hip hop
 Irish hip hop
 Italian hip hop
 Macedonian hip hop
 Montenegrin hip hop
 Norwegian hip hop
 Polish hip hop
 Romanian hip hop
 Romany hip hop
 Russian hip hop
 Serbian hip hop
 Slovak hip hop
 Slovenian hip hop
 Spanish hip hop
 Swedish hip hop
 Swiss hip hop
 Ukrainian hip hop

Middle East 
 Middle Eastern hip hop
 Arabic hip hop
 Iranian hip hop (Persian hip hop)
 Israeli hip hop
 Lebanese hip hop
 Palestinian hip hop
 Saudi Arabian hip hop
 Tunisian hip hop
 Turkish hip hop
 Yemeni hip hop

North America 
 North American hip hop
 Canadian hip hop
 Cuban hip hop
 Dominican hip hop
 Haitian hip hop
 Mexican hip hop
 Salvadoran hip hop

Oceania 
 Oceanian hip hop
 Australian hip hop
 New Zealand hip hop

South America 
 Latin hip hop
 South American hip hop
 Brazilian hip hop
 Brasília hip hop
 Colombian hip hop

Ethnic fusion genres 
African
 Bongo Flava - from Tanzania
 Boomba music - from Kenya
 Genge - from Kenya
 Hip hop galsen - from Senegal
 Hipco - from Liberia
 Hiplife - hip hop and highlife from Ghana
 Igbo rap - from Southeast Nigeria
 Kwaito - South African house/hip hop fusion
 Motswako - from Botswana and South Africa
 Zenji flava - from Tanzania

European
 Afroswing - from London
 Gyp-hop - from Romania
 Low bap - from Greece
 Romany hip hop - by Romani people of Europe
 Songo-salsa - from Spain

North American
 Merenhouse - by Dominican residents of New York City 
 Na mele paleoleo - from Hawaii
 Nuyorican rap - by Puerto Ricans of New York City 

South American
 Cumbia rap - from Colombia
 Stronda - from Rio de Janeiro
 Vigilante rap - from Brazil

Oceanian
 Urban Pasifika - from New Zealand

See also
 Hip hop culture
 List of hip hop festivals
 List of hip hop musicians
 List of electronic music genres
 List of hip hop record labels
 Rapping
 List of subcultures

References

 
Hip hop